Nabil bin Mohammed Al-Amoudi was Saudi Arabia’s transport minister from October 2017 to 23 October 2019.

Al-Amoudi holds a bachelor's degree in Chemical engineering from Stanford University in the United States in 1995. In 2001 Al-Amoudi awarded a doctorate in law from Harvard Law School in the United States.

He was the chairman of the General Authority of Ports, Aramco Services Company in Houston, Texas, and Aramco Refining Company. He was senior consultant at Saudi Aramco.

References

Nabil
Nabil
Nabil
Living people
Stanford University School of Engineering alumni
Year of birth missing (living people)